Brad Stine (born 1958) is an American tennis coach from Fresno, California. He coached former no.1 ATP player Jim Courier.

Coaching history

Junior coaching (6 years)
Brad Stine started coaching with the USTA in 1986 as a member of the US junior national team along with Greg Patton. During that time the junior national team (Junior Davis Cup Team) included Jim Courier, Pete Sampras, Michael Chang, MaliVai Washington, Todd Martin, Jonathan Stark, Jared Palmer, David Wheaton, and Jeff Tarango, who all reached top 100 ATP ranking, and many other notable players. He worked with the USTA on a part-time basis until 1991 when he was hired on a full-time basis by Jim Courier.

Collegiate coaching (9 years)
After 3 years as an assistant coach with the Fresno State Men's Tennis Team he was hired in 1985 as the head tennis coach at Fresno State University at the age of 26. He led Fresno State to their first-ever top 20 NCAA Division I national ranking. In 1990 and 1991 Brad Stine was awarded Big West Coaches of the year. Brad Stine resigned in 1991 when he took a full-time coaching position with Jim Courier.

Pro coaching (17 years)
Jim Courier (late 1990-mid-1994 and 1997–2000) During the first period Jim Courier reached the no.1 ATP ranking. He won 2 French Open and 2 Australian Open titles along with other tournaments and participated in the finals of all 4 Grand Slams. In 1997 Jim asked Brad to team up again and the relationship lasted until Jim's retirement in 2000.

Andrei Medvedev (May 1994-early 1995) Andrei was ranked top 10 ATP and won 1 tour title.

Jonathan Stark (1995–1997) During this period Jonathan was ranked no.1 ATP doubles with Byron Black. Jonathan won 1 of his 2 tour singles titles (Singapore, 1996) while being coached by Brad Stine.

Mardy Fish (2000-August 2002) Brad helped Mardy improve his ranking from 365 to 126.

Taylor Dent (November 2002-March 2003) Taylor had the most successful year on the tour winning 1 of his 4 singles titles during this time.

Sébastien Grosjean (2005)-2007 Sebastien was ranked top 25 ATP during this time and he reached quarterfinals of the Australian Open and Wimbledon.

Other players include: Sargis Sargsian and Byron Black.

Present
Brad Stine is currently a US National Coach for the USTA in Boca Raton, FL.  Previously, he was directing his 360 Tennis Academy in Fresno, California. He has been featured in Tennis Channel Academy.

Kevin Anderson announced (03/01/2018) on his Twitter account, Stine to be his 2018 touring coach. He took Kevin Anderson to the 2018 Wimbledon final and a new career-high of No. 5. 

He has been the coach of Tommy Paul since 2020.

References

1958 births
Living people
American tennis coaches
Sportspeople from Fresno, California
Tennis people from California

es:Brad Stine (entrenador de tenis)#top